is a Japanese former professional tennis player.

Hamamura has a career-high singles ranking of world No. 203, achieved on 25 February 2008. On 20 August 2007, she peaked at No. 194 in the WTA doubles rankings. In her career, she won three singles titles and nine doubles titles on the ITF Women's Circuit.

Hamamura made her WTA Tour main-draw debut at the 2010 HP Open, in the doubles event partnering Miki Miyamura.

ITF finals

Singles (3–3)

Doubles (9–9)

References

External links
 
 

1984 births
Living people
People from Kagoshima Prefecture
Sportspeople from Kagoshima Prefecture
Japanese female tennis players
20th-century Japanese women
21st-century Japanese women